Castley is a village and civil parish in the Harrogate district of North Yorkshire, England. The population of the civil parish was estimated at 70 in 2015. The village appears in the Domesday Book as Castleai, a combination of castel, and lēah, meaning the clearing near the fort.

The greater part of the Arthington Viaduct, which carries the Leeds to Harrogate railway line across the Wharfe valley, stands within the parish.

References

External links

Villages in North Yorkshire
Civil parishes in North Yorkshire